In mathematics, Spijker's lemma is a result in the theory of rational mappings of the Riemann sphere. It states that the image of a circle under a complex rational map with numerator and denominator having degree at most n has length at most 2nπ.

See also
Buffon's needle

External links

References

Theorems in complex analysis
Lemmas in analysis